Lovability is the first Korean studio album released by Korean pop boy band, ZE:A. It was released on March 17, 2011.

Background

ZE:A held a showcase to promote the release of the album. Televised music promotions followed shortly after that and lasted for roughly a month.

ZE:A's leader, Moon Junyoung, was absent from some of the promotional activities due to an orbital fracture that he sustained.

Promotions for their song Be My Girl were halted as the song was banned for presumably being "unfit for minors and will no longer be sold to those under the age of 19" as stated by the Ministry of Gender Equality and Family. The lyric line that induced the ban was the line "Be my girl tonight." within the song was ruled to suggest sexual content.

Track list

References

External links
Music Daum Page

ZE:A albums
2011 albums